The Marblehead Messenger is the third album by the band Seatrain, recorded in 1971. As with Seatrain's previous album, it was produced by George Martin.

Reception

Allmusic's brief retrospective review said the album was "better played and sung" and "much more of a band effort" than Seatrain.

Track listing
 "Gramercy" (Kulberg, Roberts) 2:59
 "The State of Georgia's Mind" (Kulberg, Roberts) 4:01
 "Protestant Preacher" (Rowan) 5:23
 "Lonely's Not the Only Way to Go" (Baskin) 2:23
 "How Sweet Thy Song" (Rowan) 5:00
 "Marblehead Messenger" (Kulberg, Roberts) 2:40
 "London Song" (Kulberg, Roberts) 4:20
 "Mississippi Moon" (Rowan) 3:13
 "Losing All the Years" (Kulberg, Roberts) 4:34
 "Despair Tire" (Greene, Kulberg, Roberts) 5:29

Personnel
 Peter Rowan – vocals, guitar
 Richard Greene — violin
 Lloyd Baskin — keyboards, vocals
 Andy Kulberg — bass, flute
 Larry Atamanuik — drums, percussion
 Jim Roberts — lyrics

References

1971 albums
Seatrain (band) albums
Albums produced by George Martin
Capitol Records albums
One Way Records albums